Bradmoor Island is an island in Suisun Bay. It is part of Solano County, California, and not managed by any reclamation district.

References

Islands of Solano County, California
Islands of the Sacramento–San Joaquin River Delta
Islands of Suisun Bay
Islands of Northern California